The 2019 Canadian Mixed Curling Championship was held from November 4 to 10, 2018 at the Fort Rouge Curling Club in Winnipeg, Manitoba. Team Manitoba, as champions, represented Canada at the 2019 World Mixed Curling Championship where they won the gold medal.

Teams
The teams are listed as follows:

Round robin

Standings
After Draw 11

Scores

Draw 1
Sunday, November 4, 7:00pm

Draw 2
Monday, November 5, 10:00am

Draw 3
Monday, November 5, 2:00pm

Draw 4
Monday, November 5, 6:00pm

Draw 5
Tuesday, November 6, 8:00am

Draw 6
Tuesday, November 6, 12:00pm

Draw 7
Tuesday, November 6, 4:00pm

Draw 8
Tuesday, November 6, 8:00pm

Draw 9
Wednesday November 7, 10:00am

Draw 10
Wednesday November 7, 2:00pm

Draw 11
Wednesday November 7, 6:00pm

Placement Round

Standings

Scores

Draw 12
Thursday, November 8, 9:00am

Draw 13
Thursday, November 8, 12:30pm

Draw 14
Thursday, November 8, 4:00pm

Draw 15
Thursday, November 8, 7:30pm

Draw 16
Friday, November 9, 10:00am

Draw 17
Friday, November 9, 2:00pm

Draw 18
Friday, November 9, 6:00pm

Playoffs

Semifinals
Saturday, November 10, 10:00 am

Bronze medal game
Saturday, November 10, 2:30 pm

Final
Saturday, November 10, 2:30 pm

References

External links

2018 in Canadian curling
Canadian Mixed Curling Championship
Canadian Mixed Curling Championship
Canadian Mixed Curling
Curling competitions in Winnipeg